Tim Darcy (born 15 January 1964) is a former Australian rules footballer who played for Geelong in the VFL/AFL.

Darcy most of his football in defence, often at fullback. He appeared in the Grand Finals of 1989 and 1992, ending up on the losing team on both occasions.

External links

1964 births
Living people
Geelong Football Club players
Essendon Football Club players
Victorian State of Origin players
Australian rules footballers from Victoria (Australia)
St Joseph's Football Club players